Bailaras is a 2017 Punjabi film starring Binnu Dhillon, Prachi Tehlan, Karamjit Anmol and Nirmal Rishi and directed by Ksshitij Chaudhary. The film was released to theaters on 6 October 2017.

Plot

Bailaras is the story of a villager named Jagga (Dhillon) who owns a Bailaras tractor and is famous for winning tochan (tug of war between tractors) competitions in and around his village. The tractor is his prized possession and his entire life revolves around it. The only problem in his life is the constant pressure on him by his family to get married but until date he did not fall in love with any girl. Other tochan competitors are jealous of his bailaras and want to defeat him in a tochan competition by any means possible. This family drama is about a simple man's dream of finding his true love and keeping his family together, which includes his tractor bailaras. Will Jagga ever find the girl of his dreams? Will the competitors ever be able to defeat him? This family entertainer shows the struggles of a simple man to fight against the world to achieve his dreams.

Cast
 Binnu Dhillon as Jagga
 Prachi Tehlan as Sonali
 Dev Kharoud as Karma
 Karamjit Anmol
 Nirmal Rishi as Jagga's Grandmother
 Ammy Virk as himself
 Hobby Dhaliwal as Jagga's uncle
  Rupinder Rupi as Jagga's aunty

References

External links
 

2017 films
Punjabi-language Indian films
2010s Punjabi-language films
Indian comedy films
2017 comedy films
Films scored by Jatinder Shah